Dypsis brevicaulis is a species of flowering plant in the Arecaceae family. It is a dwarf palm found on only three sites in Madagascar, with fewer than fifty plants ever found in the wild. The plant is part of  the IUCN Sampled Red List Index for Plants, a study of representative species from all over the world which is studying extinction trends for plants.

Description
It has 5-8 erect leaves covered with reddish scales, with two small lobes at the base of each leaf and ragged edges.

Taxonomy
The specific epithet, brevicaulis ("short-stemmed"), refers to the plant's habit of seeming to grow directly from the ground, appearing to lack a visible stem ("acaulescent"). It was first named and described as Neophloga brevicaulis in 1973 by Jean L. Guillaumet and then reclassified as Dypsis brevicaulis in 1995 by Henk Jaap Beentje and John Dransfield.

Distribution and habitat
Dypsis brevicaulis is native to the far southeast of Madagascar, in coastal evergreen forests north of Manantenina and Manafiafy/Sainte-Luce between  elevation, growing in white sand or laterite. It is found in only three locations, with fewer than fifty plants ever found in the wild. Its native habitat is threatened by deforestation for cultivation by local villagers, and by plans for mining Ilmenite in the region.

Conservation
The plant is listed as Critically Endangered, the highest risk category for wild plants, by the IUCN Red List. It is included in the IUCN Sampled Red List Index for Plants, an ongoing study of representative plant species from all over the world which is looking at extinction risk and trends.

References

External links
 
 

brevicaulis
Endemic flora of Madagascar
Critically endangered plants
Plants described in 1973